Mount Batten or Mountbatten may refer to:

Mount Batten
 Mount Batten, an outcrop of rock on a peninsula in Plymouth Sound, Devon, England, named after Sir William Batten
 RAF Mount Batten, a former Royal Air Force station and flying boat base located on the above outcrop

Mountbatten
 Mountbatten family, a European dynasty
 Mountbatten, Singapore, a neighbourhood located in the planning area of Marine Parade
 Mountbatten MRT station, in Singapore
 Earl Mountbatten of Burma, a title in the Peerage of the United Kingdom

See also

 
 
 
 
 Mount (disambiguation)
 Batten (disambiguation)
 Battenberg (disambiguation)